Bendice La Corona Tierra/Miss Earth Argentina is a national Beauty pageant that selects Argentina's representative to the Miss Earth pageant.

History
The Miss Earth Argentina title was launched in 2001 with Daniela Stucan as the first titleholder who represented Argentina in the international pageant and won an elemental title, Miss Fire (third runner-up) in the Miss Earth 2001 pageant.  In 2006, the pageant was held by Glamour Argentino. From 2007-2010, the franchise was under the organizers of Belleza Argentina/N-Entertainment under the direction of Nadia Cerri (1997 Miss International Argentina). In 2012, the franchise was awarded to Gary Colos of Miss Argentina La Nueva Era when N-Entertainment failed to send delegates in the 2010 and 2011 editions of Miss Earth.

Titleholders
Color key

See also
Miss Argentina

References

External links
 Miss Earth Argentina

Argentina
Beauty pageants in Argentina
2001 establishments in Argentina
Argentine awards